Luzula is a genus of flowering plants in the rush family Juncaceae. The genus has a cosmopolitan distribution, with species occurring throughout the world, especially in temperate regions, the Arctic, and higher elevation areas in the tropics. Plants of the genus are known commonly as wood-rush, wood rush, or woodrush. Possible origins of the genus name include the Italian lucciola ("to shine, sparkle") or the Latin luzulae or luxulae, from lux ("light"), inspired by the way the plants sparkle when wet with dew. Another etymology sometimes given is that it does derive from lucciola but that this meant a mid-summer field, or from the Latin luculus, meaning a small place; the same source also states that this name was applied by Luigi Anguillara (an Italian botanist) in 1561.

These rushes are usually perennial plants with rhizomes and sometimes stolons. They generally form clumps of cylindrical stems and narrow leaves with hair-lined edges. The inflorescence is often a dense cluster of flowers with two leaf-like bracts at the base, or sometimes a solitary flower or a few flowers borne together. They have six brownish tepals.

Luzula species are used as food plants by the larvae of some Lepidoptera species, including the smoky wainscot. Several moths of the genus Coleophora have been observed on the plants. Coleophora biforis and C. otidipennella feed exclusively on Luzula. C. antennariella is limited to Luzula pilosa, and C. sylvaticella feeds only on L. sylvatica.

Some species, notably Luzula sylvatica and its cultivars, are used as ornamental garden plants.

Species
There are around 140 species in the genus:
Luzula abchasica Novikov
Luzula abyssinica Parl.
Luzula acuminata Raf.
Luzula acutifolia H. Nordensk.
Luzula africana Drège ex Steud.
Luzula alopecuroides Desv.
 
Luzula alopecurus Desv.
Luzula alpestris H. Nordensk.
Luzula alpina Hoppe
Luzula alpinopilosa (Chaix) Breistr.
Luzula antarctica Hook. f.
Luzula arcuata (Wahlenb.) Sw.
Luzula atlantica Braun-Blanq.
Luzula atrata Edgar
Luzula australasica Steud.
Luzula banksiana E. Mey.
Luzula × bogdanii Kirschner
Luzula bomiensis K. F. Wu
Luzula × bornmuelleriana Kük.
Luzula × borreri Bromf. ex Bab.
Luzula brachyphylla Phil.
Luzula bulbosa (Alph. Wood) Smyth & L. C. Smyth
Luzula caespitosa (E. Mey.) Steud.
Luzula calabra Ten.
Luzula campestris (L.) DC.
Luzula canariensis Poir.
Luzula capitata (Miq. ex Franch. & Sav.) Kom.
Luzula caricina E. Mey.
Luzula celata Edgar
Luzula chilensis Nees & Meyen ex Kunth
Luzula colensoi Hook. f.
Luzula comosa E. Mey.
Luzula confusa Lindeb.
Luzula congesta (Thuill.) Lej.
Luzula crenulata Buchenau
Luzula crinita Hook. f.
Luzula × danica H. Nordensk. & Kirschner
Luzula decipiens Edgar
Luzula densiflora (H. Nordensk.) Edgar
Luzula denticulata Liebm.
Luzula desvauxii Kunth
Luzula divaricata S. Watson
Luzula divulgata Kirschner
Luzula divulgatiformis Bačič & Jogan
Luzula echinata (Small) F. J. Herm.
Luzula ecuadoriensis Balslev
Luzula effusa Buchenau
Luzula elegans Lowe
Luzula excelsa Buchenau
Luzula exspectata Bačič & Jogan
Luzula fallax Kirschner
Luzula × favratii K. Richt.
Luzula flaccida (Buchenau) Edgar
Luzula formosana Ohwi
Luzula forsteri (Sm.) DC.
Luzula × gayana Font Quer & Rothm.
Luzula gigantea Desv.
Luzula glabrata (Hoppe) Desv.
Luzula groenlandica Böcher
Luzula × hasleri Murr
Luzula hawaiiensis Buchenau
Luzula × heddae Kirschner
Luzula × hermannii-muelleri Asch. & Graebn.
Luzula hitchcockii Hämet-Ahti
Luzula × hybrida H. Lindb. ex Kirschner
Luzula ignivoma Kirschner
Luzula inaequalis K. F. Wu
Luzula indica Kirschner
Luzula jimboi Miyabe & Kudo
Luzula × johannis-principis Murr
Luzula johnstonii Buchenau
Luzula kjellmaniana Miyabe & Kudo
Luzula kobayasii Satake
Luzula lactea (Link) E. Mey.
Luzula leiboldii Buchenau
Luzula leptophylla Buchenau & Petrie
Luzula × levieri Asch. & Graebn.
Luzula longiflora Benth.
Luzula lutea (All.) DC.
Luzula lutescens (Koidz.) Kirschner & Miyam.
Luzula luzulina (Vill.) Racib.
Luzula luzuloides (Lam.) Dandy & Wilmott
Luzula mannii (Buchenau) Kirschner & Cheek
Luzula masafuerana Skottsb.
Luzula × media Kirschner
Luzula melanocarpa Desv.
Luzula mendocina Barros
Luzula meridionalis H. Nordensk.
Luzula modesta Buchenau
Luzula multiflora (Ehrh.) Lej.
Luzula nipponica (Satake) Kirschner & Miyam.
Luzula nivalis (Laest.) Spreng.
Luzula nivea (Nathh.) DC.
Luzula nodulosa E. Mey.
Luzula novae-cambriae Gand.
Luzula oligantha Sam.
Luzula orestera Sharsm.
Luzula ostenii (Mattf.) Herter
Luzula ovata Edgar
Luzula pallescens Sw.
Luzula papuana M. E. Jansen
Luzula parviflora (Ehrh.) Desv.
Luzula pedemontana Boiss. & Reut.
Luzula pediformis (Chaix) DC.
Luzula peruviana Desv.
Luzula × pfaffii Murr
Luzula philippinensis M. E. Jansen
Luzula picta A. Rich.
Luzula pilosa (L.) Willd.
Luzula pindica (Hausskn.) Chrtek & Krísa
Luzula piperi (Coville) M. E. Jones
Luzula plumosa E. Mey.
Luzula poimena W. M. Curtis
Luzula pumila Hook. f.
Luzula purpureosplendens Seub.
Luzula racemosa Desv.
Luzula × romanica J. Dvorák & Vorel
Luzula rufa Edgar
Luzula rufescens Fisch. ex E. Mey.
Luzula ruiz-lealii Barros
Luzula seubertii Lowe
Luzula × sichuanensis K. F. Wu
Luzula × somedana Fern-Carv. & Fern. Prieto
Luzula spicata (L.) DC.
Luzula stenophylla Steud.
Luzula subcapitata (Rydb.) H. D. Harr.
Luzula subcongesta (S. Watson) Jeps.
Luzula subsessilis (S. Watson) Buchenau
Luzula sudetica (Willd.) Schult.
Luzula sylvatica (Huds.) Gaudin
Luzula taiwaniana Satake
Luzula taurica (V. I. Krecz.) Novikov
Luzula traversii (Buchenau) Cheeseman
Luzula tristachya Desv.
Luzula ulei Buchenau
Luzula ulophylla (Buchenau) Cockayne & Laing
Luzula × vinesii Murr
Luzula vulcanica Liebm.
Luzula wahlenbergii Rupr.
Luzula × wettsteinii Buchenau

References

External links

 

 
Poales genera